Nepo may refer to:

 Nepo, an orca captured in 1969 and featured in the 1977 film Orca
 Nepo, an Esperanto-based constructed language from 1913 by Vsevolod Cheshikhin, which served as a model for a Slavic version from 1915 called Neposlava
A nickname for Ian Nepomniachtchi, Russian chess player
 A shortening of nepotism, as in the phrase "nepo baby"